Birders is a 2019 US-Mexican short documentary film directed by Otilia Portillo Padua and executive produced by Gael García Bernal. The film depicts birdwatchers on both sides of the border of US and Mexico, and how migrant birds travel back and forth over the border each year.

The documentary was released on Netflix on September 25, 2019.

References

External links
 
 

2019 short documentary films
2019 films
Netflix original documentary films
2010s Spanish-language films
Films about birds
2010s English-language films